Phyllis Piddington (9 October 1910 – 8 July 2001) was an Australian writer. The eldest of daughter of Melbourne optician William James and Lilian Aird, she was one of the first female graduates from the University of Melbourne with an MA degree. After her marriage in 1938 she went to Britain to study and teach, spending the war in Aberystwyth.  
  
She moved back to Australia in 1946, lecturing in speech and drama for 15 years. After her retirement in 1969 she published Southern Rainbow a book set in the late 1830s of South Australia. It was adapted as an anime television series Lucy-May of the Southern Rainbow as part of World Masterpiece Theater series by Nippon Animation.

Notable works 
 Southern Rainbow, Oxford University Press, Melbourne, 1982 
 "The Old Toll House", poem published in Sunlight and Shadows 2, Fellowship of Australian Writers, 1988  
 "Holiday Before War", short story published in Silver Linings, Fellowship of Australian Writers, 1992

References

1910 births
2001 deaths
20th-century Australian writers
Australian women poets
20th-century Australian women